Ninina pesnika dva is a novel by Slovenian author Bogdan Novak. It was first published in 1995.

See also
List of Slovenian novels

Slovenian novels
1995 novels